Sartanguiyeh (also Romanized as Sartangū’īyeh; also known as Sar Tangū) is a village in Maskun Rural District, Jebalbarez District, Jiroft County, Kerman Province, Iran. At the 2006 census, its population was 56, in 12 families.

References 

Populated places in Jiroft County